The Naval Information Warfare Systems Command Program Executive Offices (PEOs) are organizations responsible for the prototyping, procurement, and fielding of C4ISR (Command, Control, Communications, Computers, Intelligence, Surveillance and Reconnaissance), business information technology and space systems. Their mission is to develop, acquire, field and sustain affordable and integrated state of the art equipment for the Navy. 

The Naval Information Warfare Systems Command is organizationally aligned to the Chief of Naval Operations.  As part of its mission, NAVWAR provides support, manpower, resources, and facilities to its aligned Program Executive Offices (PEOs).  The Program Executive Offices are responsible for the execution of major defense acquisition programs.  The PEOs are organizationally aligned to the Assistant Secretary of the Navy for Research, Development and Acquisition (ASN(RDA)).  The Naval Information Warfare PEOs operate under NAVWAR policies and procedures.

There are three Naval Information Warfare Systems Program Executive Offices.

Program Executive Office Command, Control, Communications, Computers and Intelligence (PEO C4I) and Space Systems 
PEO(C4I) provides the Navy and Marine Corps with affordable, integrated and interoperable Information Warfare capability.  

The Program Executive Officer for PEO(C4I) is RDML Kurt J. Rothenhaus, USN, who assumed this post in May 2020.

PEO(C4I) comprises ten major program offices:

 PMW 120: Battlespace Awareness and Information Operations Program
 PMW 130: Information Assurance and Cyber Security Program
 PMW 150: Command and Control Program
 PMW 160: Tactical Networks Program
 PMW/A 170: Communications and GPS Navigation Program
 PMW 740: International C4I Integration Program
 PMW 750: Carrier and Air Integration Program
 PMW 760: Ship Integration Program
 PMW 770: Undersea Communications and Integration Program
 PMW 790: Shore and Expeditionary Integration Program

Program Executive Office for Digital and Enterprise Services (PEO Digital) 

PEO(Digital) provides the Navy and Marine Corps with a portfolio of enterprise-wide information technology programs designed to enable common business processes and provide standard IT capabilities. PEO Digital is digitally transforming systems to evolve and deliver modern capabilities and technologies.

The Program Executive Officer for PEO(Digital) is Ruth Youngs Lew.

PEO Digital was established in May 2020 following the disestablishment of the Program Executive Office for Enterprise Information Systems. The PEO EIS offices relating to networks, enterprise services and digital infrastructure were transitioned to PEO Digital. The program offices relating to manpower, logistics and other business solutions were transitioned to PEO Manpower, Logistics and Business Solutions.

PEO(Digital) comprises five major program offices:

 PMW 205: Naval Enterprise Network (NEN) Program
 PMW 260: Special Networks and Intelligence Mission Applications (SNIMA) Program
 PMW 270: Navy Commercial Cloud Services (NCCS) Program
 PMW 280: Special Access Programs (SAP)
 PMW 290: Enterprise IT Strategic Sourcing (EITSS) Program

Program Executive Office Manpower, Logistics and Business Solutions (PEO MLB) 
PEO(MLB) provides the Navy and Marine Corps with a portfolio of information technology programs designed to enable common business processes at sea and in the field.  

The Program Executive Officer for PEO(MLB) is Lesley L. Hubbard.

PEO MLB was established in May 2020 following the disestablishment of the Program Executive Office for Enterprise Information Systems. The PEO EIS offices relating to networks, enterprise services and digital infrastructure were transitioned to PEO Digital. The program offices relating to manpower, logistics and other business solutions were transitioned to PEO Manpower, Logistics and Business Solutions.

PEO(MLB) comprises five major program offices:

 PMW 220: Navy Enterprise Business Solutions (Navy EBS) Program
 PMW 230: Logistics Integrated Information Solutions - Marine Corps (GCSS-MC) Program
 PMW 240: Sea Warrior Program

 PMW 250: Enterprise Systems and Services (E2S) Program
 PMW 444: Navy Maritime Maintenance Enterprise Solution (NMMES) Technical Refresh (TR) Program Program

See also 
Marine Corps Systems Command
Naval Air Systems Command
Naval Facilities Engineering Command
Naval Information Warfare Systems Command
Naval Sea Systems Command
Naval Supply Systems Command

Footnotes

Shore commands of the United States Navy